The gray starsnout (Bathyagonus alascanus), also known as the gray starsnout poacher in the United States, is a fish in the family Agonidae. It was described by Charles Henry Gilbert in 1896. It is a marine, temperate water-dwelling fish which is known from the eastern Pacific Ocean, from the coast of the Bering Sea in Alaska, to the Oregon-California border. It dwells at a depth range of 18–252 metres, and inhabits rocky areas. Males can reach a maximum total length of 13 centimetres.

The species epithet "alascanus" refers to the species' type locality in Alaska. The Gray starsnout is preyed on by the Pacific cod (Gadus macrocephalus).

References

Gray starsnout
Fish described in 1896